Anancylus papuanus is a species of beetle in the family Cerambycidae. It was described by Stephan von Breuning in 1976. It is known from Papua New Guinea.

References

Mesosini
Beetles described in 1976